Evgeny Mons (born March 27, 1989) is a Russian professional ice hockey centre who currently plays for HC 07 Detva of the Slovak Extraliga (Slovak).

Mons made his top league professional debut with Severstal Cherepovets in the inaugural Kontinental Hockey League season of 2008–09.

After 13 seasons within Severstal Cherepovets, Mons left the club as a free agent prior to the 2018–19 season, and signed a two-year contract with Russian club, HC Vityaz of the KHL, on May 4, 2018.

References

External links

1989 births
Living people
HC 07 Detva players
HK Dukla Michalovce players
Russian ice hockey centres
Severstal Cherepovets players
HC Vityaz players
Russian expatriate sportspeople in Ukraine
Russian expatriate sportspeople in Slovakia
Expatriate ice hockey players in Slovakia
Expatriate ice hockey players in Ukraine
Russian expatriate ice hockey people